The Mulde is a river in Saxony and Saxony-Anhalt, Germany.

The river is formed by the confluence, near Colditz,  of the Zwickauer Mulde (running through Zwickau) and the Freiberger Mulde (with Freiberg on its banks), both rising from the Ore Mountains. From here the river runs northwards through Saxony (Grimma, Wurzen, Eilenburg, Bad Düben) and Saxony-Anhalt (Jeßnitz and Dessau, the old capital of Anhalt).

In August 2002 a flood caused severe damage, that even endangered the UNESCO World Heritage Site "Dessau-Wörlitzer Gartenreich" and the city Dessau. 

Its name could be derived from Old German (possibly Gothic) "Mulda" (𐌼ᚢ𐌻ᛞᚨ), meaning "dust" and a cognate of English "mould"). But more possibly it is related to the German "mahlen" which means "to mill". Therefore, Mulde probably means "the milling river" and corresponds to the great number of water mills driven by the river in former times.

See also
List of rivers of Saxony
List of rivers of Saxony-Anhalt

References

Notes

 
Rivers of Saxony
Rivers of Saxony-Anhalt
Rivers of Germany